RPG Maker 2003 (RPGツクール 2003) is the third in the series of programs for the development of role-playing games, developed by Kadokawa Games. It features a database of pre-made backgrounds, music, animations, weapons and characters.

On April 24, 2015, RPG Maker 2003 received an official English translation, and was released into the Steam platform.

RPG Maker 2003 was superseded by RPG Maker XP.

Etymology
It is named after Windows Server 2003.

Features

Graphics
All graphics within RPG Maker 2003 are in 2D like its predecessor, RPG Maker 2000, and makes use of the same graphical resources with a few minor changes in resolution (though some tilesets, while similar in style to those included in RPG Maker 2000, include redrawn resources). In addition, Battle Character and System2 sets are used to go with RPG Maker 2003's new battle system.

Sprites
The majority of all graphics within the game are achieved with sprites, or single images that has a composition of frames in a specific orientation so that the graphics rendering software of RM2k3 can give the impression of movement.

Music
RPG Maker 2003 allows the use of MIDI and WAV much like RPG Maker 2000, its predecessor, for background music. Both programs received an update on May 14, 2003 to support MP3 files (which was a strongly desired feature by users) and ADPCM compressed WAV. The developers provided a tool for compressing sound effects on the same day. RM2k3 does not support any audio editing software so a third party program is needed in order to compose desired sounds.

Runtime Package
RPG Maker 2003, much like its predecessor RPG Maker 2000 and its successor RPG Maker XP, comes with its own set of Runtime Package files, also known as the RTP. The RTP is a whole set of default graphics, music, and sound effects that are used in RPG Maker 2003 and, in most cases, the RTP must be downloaded to the computer to play the games made with RPG Maker 2003. Thanks to the RTP, created games can lessen their file size if a lot of material from the RTP was used.

Bonus contents
Early order also included RPG Maker Alpha (RPGツクールα) I-mode i-appli for NTT DoCoMo 503 or later platform.

Enhancements from RPG Maker 95 & 2000
Perhaps RPG Maker 2003's most notable new feature is its battle system, which is in third-person side view rather than the first person view that was used in the previous RPG Maker programs. In addition, unlike its predecessors, RPG Maker 2003 makes use of a real-time "ATB" system, like in the Final Fantasy games, instead of the classical "turn-based" system. At what point a character or enemy can take actions depends on their agility levels instead of being rigidly defined as a turn, though the software shipped with a bug that causes battle speed to dramatically slow down when there is a large disparity between Agility values of different combatants. This was never addressed by Enterbrain, though it can typically be avoided by users setting all combatants to have Agility values roughly similar to each other.

A less noticeable but no less significant change is that the program more than doubles the number of images that can be displayed simultaneously using the "Show Picture" command, allowing for fifty separate images compared to RPG Maker 2000's twenty. As the program predates the Ruby-based scripting language introduced in later versions, the command is essential for users wishing to move beyond the confines of the engine's default interface, and this simple change allows creators far more flexibility to craft their own custom game systems in 2003 compared to previous versions. The 2015 rerelease of the program takes this positive change even further, incorporating community-crafted DLLs that increase the limit to one thousand simultaneous pictures, and add additional functionality for interacting with and manipulating these images.

RPG Maker 2003 is also the only program in the RPG Maker series which allows weapons and armor to cast spells when used as items.

RPG Maker 2003 can convert RPG Maker 2000 games into RPG Maker 2003 games, though this cannot be reversed.

References

External links
Enterbrain page

2003
Video game IDE